City of Adelaide was a sailing ship of 280 tons, built in Jersey, which carried emigrants from England to Adelaide, South Australia.

Voyages
Arrived in SA 6 July 1839 from London, Captain Donaldson
Arrived in SA 28 January 1840 from Hobart, Captain Donaldson
Arrived in SA 6 September 1841 from London, Captain Foster

See also
City of Adelaide (1864)

References

1838 ships
Ships of South Australia